Badal Bhattacharya was an Indian politician. He was elected as MLA of Ashoknagar Vidhan Sabha Constituency in West Bengal Legislative Assembly in 1999. He was the first legislator of Bharatiya Janata Party in West Bengal Legislative Assembly. He died on 1 November 2014 at the age of 70.

References

2015 deaths
Bharatiya Janata Party politicians from West Bengal
Members of the West Bengal Legislative Assembly